"Women in Guam History" is a project of Guampedia, honoring notable women who contributed to the territory's culture.  Fo’na is the lone woman of mythology on the list, and is noted in the culture as the creator of the Chamorro people who are the indigenous people of the Mariana Islands. The sovereign state of Guam is an unincorporated territory of the United States in the Micronesia subregion of the western Pacific Ocean.

The list of Women in Guam's History

References

External links
Women in Guam History home page

Guam
Guam
Gender in Guam
Guam
Women in Guam